AS Monaco won Division 1 season 1962/1963 of the French Association Football League with 50 points.

Participating teams

 Angers SCO
 Bordeaux
 FC Grenoble
 RC Lens
 Olympique Lyonnais
 Olympique de Marseille
 AS Monaco
 SO Montpellier
 FC Nancy
 OGC Nice
 Nîmes Olympique
 RC Paris
 Stade de Reims
 Stade Rennais UC
 FC Rouen
 UA Sedan-Torcy
 Stade Français FC
 RC Strasbourg
 Toulouse FC
 US Valenciennes-Anzin

Final table

Promoted from Division 2, who will play in Division 1 season 1963/1964
 AS Saint-Etienne:Champion of Division 2
 FC Nantes:runner-up of Division 2

Results

Top goalscorers

References
 Division 1 season 1962-1963 at pari-et-gagne.com

Ligue 1 seasons
French
1